Vranji Vrh is a dispersed settlement in the Slovene Hills southwest of Sladki Vrh in the Municipality of Šentilj in northeastern Slovenia.

References

External links
Vranji Vrh on Geopedia

Populated places in the Municipality of Šentilj